Kazıklı Bay is an Aegean bay of Turkey. Although typically a bay, its name in Turkish is internationally registered as Kazıklı Limanı  ("Kazıklı Harbor"). 

It is a part of Milas ilçe (district) of Muğla Province. On the northeast end of the bay there are two lesser bays called bays of Karasu. There are also two lesser bays on the northwest coast of the bay called Ardışlıağıl Bay and Yarım Bay.

References

Gulfs of the Aegean Sea
Gulfs of Turkey
Landforms of Muğla Province
Milas District